Ariel Eduardo Longo De Caterina (born 7 August 1953) is a Uruguayan football manager and former player who played as a defender. He is the current manager of the Uruguay women's football team.

References

External links
 

1992 births
Living people
Uruguayan footballers
Association football defenders
Sud América players
Uruguayan expatriate footballers
Uruguayan football managers
Sud América managers
Liverpool F.C. (Montevideo) managers
Real C.D. España managers
Club Sportivo Cerrito managers
Tacuarembó F.C. managers
Juventud de Las Piedras managers
Deportivo Petapa managers
Boston River managers
Uruguay women's national football team managers
Uruguayan expatriate football managers
Uruguayan expatriate sportspeople in China
Uruguayan expatriate sportspeople in Honduras
Uruguayan expatriate sportspeople in Guatemala
Expatriate football managers in China
Expatriate football managers in Honduras
Expatriate football managers in Guatemala